Oryctographia Carniolica (Carniolan Mineralogy; with the subtitle  'or a Physical Geography of the Duchy of Carniola, Istria, and in Part the Neighboring Lands') is a four-volume work by Belsazar Hacquet, published in Leipzig in 1778, 1781, 1784, and 1789. It discusses the physical properties of the Duchy of Carniola, Istria, and parts of the neighboring lands. It also includes an in-depth description of the Idrija mercury mine.

The front page of the work presents the first known depiction of Triglav, the highest mountain in Slovenia. The copper engraving was produced by C. Conti after a drawing by Franz Xaver Baraga.

References

External links

Book series introduced in 1778
Geology books
German-language books
1778 non-fiction books
1781 non-fiction books
1784 non-fiction books
1789 non-fiction books
History of science and technology in Slovenia
Triglav
Geographic history of Slovenia
18th century in Carniola
Books about Slovenia